Founded in 1895, the Hawaiian Sugar Planters' Association (HSPA) was an unincorporated, voluntary organization of sugarcane plantation owners in the Hawaiian Islands. Its objective was to promote the mutual benefits of its members and the development of the sugar industry in the islands. It conducted scientific studies and gathered accurate records about the sugar industry. The HSPA practiced paternalistic management. Plantation owners introduced welfare programs, sometimes out of concern for the workers, but often designed to suit their economic ends. Threats, coercion, and "divide and rule" tactics were employed, particularly to keep the plantation workers ethnically segregated.

The HSPA also actively campaigned to bring workers to Hawaii. For instance, they opened offices in Manila and Vigan, Ilocos Sur, to recruit Filipino workers and provide them free passage to Hawaii. Similarly, the HSPA became a powerful organization with tentacles reaching as far as Washington, D.C., where it successfully lobbied for legislation and labor and immigration policies beneficial to the sugar industry of Hawaii.  On March 24, 1934, the  U.S. Congress passed the Tydings–McDuffie Act (Philippine Independence Act), which reclassified all Filipinos living in the United States as aliens and restricted entry of laborers from the Philippines to 50 per year.

HSPA now operates under the name Hawaii Agriculture Research Center (HARC). HSPA's and HARC's archives are kept at HARC's office.

A significant project undertaken by HSPA was to archive Hawaii's sugar company records. Between 1983 and 1994, archivists hired by HSPA received and processed records from dozens of sugar companies and related entities. The archival collection, now called the HSPA Plantation Archives, was donated to the University of Hawaii at Mānoa Library.

See also
Hawaiian sugar strike of 1946

References

Further reading
Nakamura, Kelli Y. "Hawaiian Sugar Planters' Association," Densho Encyclopedia (26 February 2014).

Agriculture in Hawaii
Sugar organizations
Organizations based in Hawaii
Pre-statehood history of Hawaii
Organizations established in 1895
1895 establishments in Hawaii
American sugar industry
Agricultural organizations based in the United States